The 2009–10 Florida Panthers season was the 17th season for the franchise in the National Hockey League.  After earning 77 points in the season, the Panthers did not qualify for the playoffs.

Off-season
The Panthers moved their training facilities and administrative center to the 'Incredible Ice' complex in Coral Springs, Florida. A new $10 million,  expansion was built to accommodate the Panthers.

On June 1, 2009, General Manager Jacques Martin resigned his position to become the head coach of the Montreal Canadiens. Assistant General Manager Randy Sexton assumed the duties of general manager on an interim basis, and was named general manager just prior to the start of the season. This is Sexton's second time as an NHL general manager. He was the Ottawa Senators general manager in the early 1990s. After the season, the Panthers replaced Sexton with new general manager, Dale Tallon.

Pre-season

Regular season

Divisional standings

Conference standings

Game log

Playoffs
The Panthers failed to make the playoffs for the ninth consecutive season. They have not qualified for the playoffs since the 1999–2000 season.

Player statistics

Skaters
Note: GP = Games played; G = Goals; A = Assists; Pts = Points; +/− = Plus/minus; PIM = Penalty minutes

Goaltenders
Note: GP = Games played; TOI = Time on ice (minutes); W = Wins; L = Losses; OT = Overtime losses; GA = Goals against; GAA= Goals against average; SA= Shots against; SV= Saves; Sv% = Save percentage; SO= Shutouts

†Denotes player spent time with another team before joining Panthers. Stats reflect time with Panthers only.
‡Traded mid-season
Bold/italics denotes franchise record

Awards and records

Awards

Records

Milestones

Transactions 

The Panthers were involved in the following transactions during the 2009–10 season.

Trades 

|}

Free agents acquired

Free agents lost

Claimed via waivers

Lost via waivers

Player signings

Draft picks 

Florida's picks at the 2009 NHL Entry Draft in Montreal, Quebec.

See also 
 2009–10 NHL season

Farm teams 
The Florida Panthers maintain affiliations with two minor league teams, the Rochester Americans and the Florida Everblades.

References 

Florida Panthers seasons
F
F
2009 in sports in Florida
2010 in sports in Florida